Marion Hoffman (born 29 September 1949) is an Australian sprinter. She competed in the women's 100 metres at the 1972 Summer Olympics.

References

1949 births
Living people
Athletes (track and field) at the 1972 Summer Olympics
Australian female sprinters
Olympic athletes of Australia
Place of birth missing (living people)
Commonwealth Games medallists in athletics
Commonwealth Games gold medallists for Australia
Commonwealth Games bronze medallists for Australia
Athletes (track and field) at the 1970 British Commonwealth Games
Olympic female sprinters
20th-century Australian women
21st-century Australian women
People educated at Brisbane State High School
Medallists at the 1970 British Commonwealth Games